In German linguistics, the Sankt Goar line,  line, or  line is an isogloss separating the dialects to the north, which have a t in the words  (English that) and  (English what), from the dialects to the south (including standard German), which have an s: . The line runs from North-East to South-West and crosses the river Rhine at the town of Sankt Goar.

See also
 High German consonant shift
 Rhenish fan

Isoglosses